Muhammad Ilham (born 22 January 1981 in Majene), usually called M. Ilham is a retired Indonesian professional football player. He is famous for his stepovers and dribbling skills. He can play with both feet, and he currently plays the position of a winger.

Club career 
On 1 December 2014, he signed with Persija Jakarta.

International career 

|}

Honours 
Indonesia
Winner
 Indonesian Independence Cup: 2008

References

External links 
 
 

1981 births
Living people
People from Majene
Sportspeople from West Sulawesi
Indonesian footballers
Association football wingers
Indonesia international footballers
PSPS Pekanbaru players
Petrokimia Putra players
Persib Bandung players
Pelita Bandung Raya players
Persikota Tangerang players
Persija Jakarta players
Persebaya Surabaya players